The B platform  (also known as the B body) is a full-size rear-wheel drive car platform that was produced by General Motors (GM) from 1926 to 1996. Originally made for Oldsmobile and Buick, all of General Motors's five main makes would use it at some point. It was closely related to the original rear-wheel drive C and D platforms, and was used for convertibles, hardtops, coupes, sedans, and station wagons. With approximately 12,960,000 units built, divided across four marques, the 1965-70 B platform is the fourth best selling automobile platform in history after the Volkswagen Beetle, Ford Model T and the Fiat 124.

Originally, the B platform was used for Buick and Oldsmobile products, with the A platform  for Chevrolet and Oakland, and the C and D platforms devoted to Cadillac.  During the General Motors companion make program, Vikings and Marquettes were also manufactured on this platform, as were La Salles from 1936 to 1940. The B platform became GM's base model platform in 1958, when all existing Chevrolet products were upgraded to the B platform. 

The B platform was used for the Pontiac Streamliner Torpedo and Streamliner, the Oldsmobile L-Series, Series 70 and Series 88, the Buick Special and Century, the LaSalle Series 50 and the Cadillac Series 60, Series 61 and Series 63. 

For the 1959 model year, the previous A and B bodies were built on the new B platform that lasted until 1996.  During this period, the B was the most modest of GM's three full-sized platforms, slotting below the upscale C and the luxury D. The A platform designation would be resurrected by GM in 1964 for a new series of intermediate-sized cars including the Chevrolet Chevelle, Pontiac Tempest, Oldsmobile Cutlass and Buick Skylark.

History
The GM B platform was introduced in 1926 with the Buick Master Six, and the Oldsmobile Model 30, and had at least 12 major re-engineering and restyling efforts, in 1937, 1939, 1941, 1949, 1954, 1957, 1959, 1961, 1965, 1971, 1977, and 1991; along with interim styling changes in 1942, 1969 and 1980 that included new sheetmetal and revised rooflines. The platform was downsized in length by approximately 10 inches in 1977 and reduced in weight by an average of 800 pounds. In 1991, the platform received its last major redesign, regaining several inches in length, numerous frame improvements and reinforcements, while the shorter wheelbase remained unchanged. The last B-cars rolled off the line in 1996, leaving only Ford producing domestic large rear wheel drive sedans until the line was phased out in late 2011, with Chrysler reentering the market with their LX platform in 2005.

Known for being durable and reliable, most B platform cars used suspensions utilizing coil springs in the front and leaf-springs in the rear until 1958, when they switched to coils in the rear; exceptions include the 1959-60 Oldsmobile 88, which used coil springs in front and multi-leaf springs in the rear. All B platform cars since 1965 have used perimeter frames with side rails, along with the 1961-64 B platform Pontiacs and Oldsmobiles. The 1958-60 Buicks and 1959-60 Oldsmobiles used a ladder-type frame while an X-frame without side rails was used on 1959-60 Pontiacs, 1959-64 Chevrolets and 1961-64 Buicks.

The Rear Drive B platform was the last platform design to have the gasoline tank filler port behind the license plate after 1958. Exceptions included all station wagons, as well as all 1961-64 cars - which had the tank filler in the rear fender on the driver's side and 1965 Buicks which had their fuel filler door above the license plate. Also, the Pontiac B platform vehicles from 1941 until 1948 had the fuel filler door in the rear fender on the driver's side. This would also be the case with the B platform Oldsmobile and Buick.

By 1986, the Buick LeSabre and Oldsmobile Delta 88 moved to the GM H platform. And in 1991, Chairman Robert Stempel said: He also stated that the rear drive 1992 Buick Roadmaster and Chevrolet Caprice had been produced "over my dead body." No successor for this platform was made after 1996, when the Roadmaster and Caprice ceased production.  However, the Caprice would be revived and built on the Opel developed V platform for the Middle East but built by Holden, while years later the Caprice for police use along with the Impala SS successor, the Chevrolet SS, would return to America built on the GM Zeta Platform which was developed by Holden in Australia.

Use

Sedans

Chevrolet
 1959–1972 Chevrolet Biscayne
 1973–1975 Chevrolet Biscayne (sold only in Canada)
 1958–1975 Chevrolet Bel Air
 1976–1981 Chevrolet Bel Air (sold only in Canada, as a rebadged Impala)
 1958–1985 Chevrolet Impala
 1994–1996 Chevrolet Impala SS
 1966–1996 Chevrolet Caprice
 1996 Chevrolet Caprice SS (sold only in the Middle East, as a rebadged Impala SS)
Pontiac
 1937–1940 Pontiac Deluxe Eight
 1941      Pontiac Streamliner Torpedo
 1942–1951 Pontiac Streamliner
 1959–1981 Pontiac Bonneville
 1959–1981 Pontiac Catalina
 1959–1981 Pontiac Parisienne (Canada only)
 1983–1986 Pontiac Parisienne
 1959–1966 Pontiac Star Chief
 1959–1970 Pontiac Strato Chief (Canada only)
 1960–1961 Pontiac Ventura
 1962–1981 Pontiac Laurentian (Canada only)
 1966–1969 Pontiac Grande Parisienne (Canada only)
 1967–1970 Pontiac Executive
 1971–1975 Pontiac Grand Ville
Oldsmobile
 1926–1935 Oldsmobile F-Series
 1929–1931 Viking
 1936–1939 Oldsmobile L-Series
 1939      Oldsmobile G-Series
 1940      Oldsmobile Series 70
 1941      Oldsmobile Dynamic 76
 1941      Oldsmobile Dynamic 78
 1942–1947 Oldsmobile Dynamic Cruiser 76
 1942–1947 Oldsmobile Dynamic Cruiser 78
 1948      Oldsmobile Dynamic 76
 1948      Oldsmobile Dynamic 78
 1949      Oldsmobile Futuramic 76
 1949      Oldsmobile Futuramic 88
 1950      Oldsmobile 76
 1950–1956 Oldsmobile 88
 1951–1964 Oldsmobile Super 88
 1957      Oldsmobile Golden Rocket 88
 1958–1966 Oldsmobile Dynamic 88
 1964–1966 Oldsmobile Jetstar 88
 1965–1985 Oldsmobile Delta 88
 1967–1968 Oldsmobile Delmont 88
Buick
 1926–1935 Buick Master Six
 1926-1935 Buick Standard Six
 1930 Marquette
 1936–1942 Buick Century
 1954–1958 Buick Century
 1936–1958 Buick Special
 1959–1962 Buick Invicta
 1959–1985 Buick LeSabre
 1963–1970 Buick Wildcat
 1971–1973 Buick Centurion
 1991–1996 Buick Roadmaster
Cadillac
 1936–1938 Cadillac Series 60
 1936–1940 LaSalle Series 50
 1939 Cadillac Series 61
 1941–1947 Cadillac Series 61
 1950–1951 Cadillac Series 61
 1941–1942 Cadillac Series 63

Two-door only

 
 1961–1969 Chevrolet Impala SS
 1961–1966 Oldsmobile Starfire
 1964–1965 Oldsmobile Jetstar I
 1962–1968 Pontiac Grand Prix
 1966 Pontiac 2+2
 1977-1978 Buick Riviera

Station wagons

 1941–1942 Buick Special Estate
 1954–1958 Buick Century Estate
 1954–1958 Buick Special Estate
 1959–1963 Buick Invicta Estate
 1959–1964 Buick LeSabre Estate
 1970      Buick Estate
 1971–1976 Buick Estate (trim between LeSabre and Electra)
 1977–1979 Buick Estate (with LeSabre trim)
 1977–1979 Buick Estate Limited (with Electra trim)
 1980–1989 Buick Electra Estate
 1980–1989 Buick LeSabre Estate
 1990      Buick Estate
 1991–1996 Buick Roadmaster Estate
 1966–1968 Chevrolet Caprice Estate
 1969–1970 Chevrolet Kingswood Estate
 1971–1972 Chevrolet Kingswood Estate (Caprice trim)
 1973–1976 Chevrolet Caprice Estate
 1977–1996 Chevrolet Caprice Estate
 1959–1961 Chevrolet Nomad (Impala trim)
 1962–1968 Chevrolet Impala
 1969–1970 Chevrolet Kingswood
 1971–1972 Chevrolet Kingswood (Impala trim)
 1973–1976 Chevrolet Impala
 1977–1985 Chevrolet Impala
 1959–1960 Chevrolet Kingswood (Bel Air trim)
 1959–1961 Chevrolet Parkwood (Bel Air trim)
 1962–1968 Chevrolet Bel Air
 1969–1970 Chevrolet Townsman
 1971–1972 Chevrolet Townsman (Bel Air trim)
 1973–1975 Chevrolet Bel Air
 1977–1979 Chevrolet Bel Air (sold only in Canada, as a rebadged Impala)
 1959–1961 Chevrolet Brookwood (Biscayne trim)
 1962–1968 Chevrolet Biscayne
 1969–1970 Chevrolet Brookwood
 1971–1972 Chevrolet Brookwood (Biscayne trim)
 1949–1950 Oldsmobile 88 station wagon
 1949–1950 Oldsmobile 76 station wagon
 1957      Oldsmobile 88 Golden Rocket Fiesta
 1957–1963 Oldsmobile Super 88 Fiesta
 1958–1964 Oldsmobile Dynamic 88 Fiesta
 1971–1976 Oldsmobile Custom Cruiser (trim between 88 and 98)
 1977–1992 Oldsmobile Custom Cruiser
 1942–1951 Pontiac Streamliner station wagon
 1959–1970 Pontiac Bonneville Safari
 1971–1976 Pontiac Grand Safari (Grand Ville trim)
 1977–1981 Pontiac Bonneville Safari
 1959–1970 Pontiac Parisienne Safari (Canada only)
 1977–1981 Pontiac Parisienne Safari (Canada only)
 1967–1969 Pontiac Grande Parisienne Safari (Canada only)
 1983–1986 Pontiac Parisienne Safari
 1959–1970 Pontiac Catalina Safari
 1971–1976 Pontiac Safari (Catalina trim)
 1977–1981 Pontiac Catalina Safari
 1959–1970 Pontiac Laurentian Safari (Canada only)
 1977–1981 Pontiac Laurentian Safari (Canada only)
 1987–1989 Pontiac Safari

Coupe utilities

 1959-1960 Chevrolet El Camino

References

External links
BBodyForum.com The '66-'96 GM B-Body Community
GM B platform Forum For owners & enthusiasts of 1965 to 1996 GM B-Bodies
 List of GM VIN codes

B